Matheus J. "Thé" Lau (17 July 1952 – 23 June 2015) was a Dutch musician and writer. Besides his solo career, he was the lead singer of the Dutch band The Scene. He was born in Bergen, North Holland.

Music career
Lau played guitar in several bands and was a member of the Dutch band Neerlands Hoop Express. In 1979 he founded the band The Scene with Lau as lead singer and guitarist. The band's most well-known songs are "Blauw" and "Iedereen is van de wereld".

Lau left The Scene in 2003 and got touring with keyboardist Jan-Peter Bast in Dutch theaters. In October 2006, he resumed the tour under title Tempel der liefde accompanied by Jan-Peter Bast and tango string quartet Pavadita.

In 2007, The Scene had a reunion with Lau and three former band members. (Jeroen Booy, Emilie Blom van Assendelft and Otto Cooymans) They started touring again, and released a new CD.

In 2010, Thé Lau topped the Dutch charts with a collaboration with Dutch rapper Lange Frans, "Zing voor me".

Writing career
In 2000, he made his debut in literature by writing short stories De sterren van de hemel (meaning the stars of heaven). In 2003, his writings were published in a book titled Thé Lau, de teksten. His first novel was Hemelrijk in 2004, followed by a collection of music stories entitled In de dakgoot (meaning in the gutter). In 2007 his work has appeared in 1000 vissen, a collection of stories about the Amsterdam's neighborhood Spaarndammerbuurt where Thé Lau had been living and working for 15 years.

Illness and death
Lau was diagnosed with throat cancer in August 2013 and was told he could not be cured in April 2014. He died in June 2015 in Amsterdam.

In popular culture
In vrijheid is a 2005 song Thé Lau wrote as a liberation song for Bevrijdingsdag (Liberation Day in the Netherlands). He performed it on May 5, 2005 and the song became very popular for the annual celebrations of the Day.
Thé Lau was part of the Dutch "Ticket For Tibet" event and took part in the album release of the collective in 2008.

Discography
Source for Thé Lau discography / Source for The Scene discography:

Albums
with The Scene
1980: The Scene
1985: This is real
1988: Rij rij rij
1991: Blauw (NED #41)
1992: Open (NED #26)
1993: Avenue de la Scene (NED #34)
1994: The Scene Live (NED #43)
1996: Arena (NED #35)
1997: 2 Meter Sessies (NED #53)
2000: Rauw, hees, teder - Het beste van (NED #69)
2007: 2007 (NED #79)
2009: Liefde op doorreis (NED #46)
2012: Code (NED #44)

Solo
1998: 1998
2002: De God van Nederland (re-released in 2004 with the bonus CD Overspel)
2006: Tempel der liefde (NED #63)
2014: Platina BluesSingles
with The Scene
Non-charting
1980: "Young Dogs, Young Blood			
1982: "The Beat" / "Bliss"		
1982: "Stappen" / "Allied Cigarettes"			
1986: "S.E.X."		
1987: "Ritme" 		
1987: "Wereld"			
1988: "Borderline"		
1988: "Rij rij rij"			
1989: "Rauw hees teder"
Charting
1990: "Rigoreus" (NED #68)
1991: "Iedereen is van de wereld" (NED #62)
1991: "Blauw" (NED #15)
1992: "Zuster" (NED #33)
1992: "Open" (NED #40)
1992: "Samen" (NED #57)
1993: "Iedereen is van de wereld" / "Nieuwe laarzen (van een oude leest)" (The Scene / De Dijk) (NED #16)
2000: "Helden" (NED 84)

Solo
2003: "Brandende regen" (NED #91)
2005: "In vrijheid" (NED #48)
2010: "Zing voor me (Lange Frans & Thé Lau) (NED #1)
Collective
2004: "Lied voor Beslan" (by Artiesten voor Beslan) (NED #17)

DVDs
2003: The showBibliography
2000: De Sterren van de Hemel2003: De Teksten2004: Hemelrijk2006: In de DakgootParticipations in collections
2007: 1000 vissen'' (bibliophilia by Uitgeverij Brokaat)

References

External links
Discogs

1952 births
2015 deaths
20th-century Dutch male singers
Dutch rock guitarists
Dutch male guitarists
Dutch male writers
People from Bergen, North Holland
Deaths from lung cancer
Deaths from cancer in the Netherlands